Fabric 34 is a DJ mix compilation album by Ellen Allien, as part of the Fabric Mix Series.

Track listing
  Schubert - S1 (Don't Believe the Chord - Pop Hype) - Statik
  Larry Heard Presents Mr. White - The Sun Can’t Compare (Long Version) - Alleviated
  Estroe - Driven (Jamie Jones' Pacific Mix) - Connaisseur Superieur
  Damián Schwartz - Tú Y Yo (Peros Nos Volvemos A Levantar) (Pilas Remix) - Mupa
  Don Williams - Orderly Kaos - a.r.t.less
  Melodyboy 2000 - Sound Stealer - Futuro
  Artificial Latvamäki - It Is Not Now Either - Mezzotinto
  Cobblestone Jazz - India in Me - Wagon Repair
  Roman Flügel - Mutter - Klang
  Ø - Aaltovaihe - Säkhö
  Thom Yorke - Harrowdown Hill - XL
  Ellen Allien - Just a Woman - Bpitch Control
  Ben Klock - Journey - Bpitch Control
  Heartthrob - Baby Kate (Plastikman Remix) - M_nus
  Apparat - Arcadia - Random Noize

References

External links
Pre-release article at Resident Advisor
Fabric: Fabric 34

Fabric (club) albums
2007 compilation albums